Massala-Barala is a village in north-western Ivory Coast. It is in the sub-prefecture of Booko, Koro Department, Bafing Region, Woroba District.

Massala-Barala was a commune until March 2012, when it became one of 1126 communes nationwide that were abolished.

Notes

Former communes of Ivory Coast
Populated places in Woroba District
Populated places in Bafing Region